Rudy Henry Wiebe  (born 4 October 1934) is a Canadian author and professor emeritus in the department of English at the University of Alberta since 1992. Rudy Wiebe was made an Officer of the Order of Canada in the year 2000.

Early life

Wiebe was born at Speedwell, near Fairholme, Saskatchewan, in what would later become his family's chicken barn. For thirteen years he lived in an isolated community of about 250 people, as part of the last generation of homesteaders to settle the Canadian west. He did not speak English until age six since Mennonites at that time customarily spoke Low German at home and standard German in church. He attended the small school three miles from his farm and the Speedwell Mennonite Brethren Church. In 1947, he moved with his family to Coaldale, Alberta.

He received his B.A. in 1956 from the University of Alberta and then studied under a Rotary International Fellowship at the University of Tübingen in West Germany, near Stuttgart. In Germany, he studied literature and theology and travelled to England, Austria, Switzerland and Italy. In 1962, he received a Bachelor of Theology degree from Mennonite Brethren Bible College in Winnipeg, now Canadian Mennonite University.

Career
While in Winnipeg, he worked as the editor of the Mennonite Brethren Herald, a position he was asked to leave after the publication of his controversial debut novel Peace Shall Destroy Many (1962), the book that heralded a wave of Mennonite literature in the decades that followed.

Wiebe taught at Goshen College in Goshen, Indiana from 1963 to 1967,  and taught at the University of Alberta in Edmonton for many decades after that.

In addition to Peace Shall Destroy Many, Wiebe's novels include First and Vital Candle (1966), The Blue Mountains of China (1970), The Temptations of Big Bear (1973), The Scorched-wood People (1977), The Mad Trapper (1980), My Lovely Enemy (1983), A Discovery of Strangers (1994), Sweeter Than All the World (2001), and Come Back (2014). He has also published collections of short stories, essays, and children's books. In 2006 he published a volume of memoirs about his childhood, entitled Of This Earth: A Mennonite Boyhood in the Boreal Forest. His work has explored the traditions and struggles of people in the Prairie provinces, both settlers, often Mennonite, and First Nations people.

Wiebe won the Governor General's Award for Fiction twice, for The Temptations of Big Bear (1973) and A Discovery of Strangers (1994). Thomas King says of The Temptations of Big Bear that "Wiebe captures the pathos and the emotion of Native people at a certain point in their history and he does it well ... Wiebe points out to us that Canada has not come to terms with Native peoples, that there is unfinished business to attend to." Wiebe was awarded the Royal Society of Canada's Lorne Pierce Medal in 1986. In 2000 he was made an Officer of the Order of Canada. In 2003 Wiebe was a member of the jury for the Giller Prize.

Personal life 
In 1958 he married Tena Isaak, with whom he had two children.

Awards

 1973 Governor General's Award for Fiction for The Temptations of Big Bear
 1994 Governor General's Award for Fiction for A Discovery of Strangers
 2007 Charles Taylor Prize for Of This Earth: A Mennonite Boyhood in the Boreal Forest
 2009 Honorary Doctor of Letters from the University of Alberta

Bibliography

Novels
 Peace Shall Destroy Many, McClelland & Stewart, 1962
 First and Vital Candle, Eerdmans, 1966
 The Blue Mountains of China, Eerdmans, 1970
 The Temptations of Big Bear, McClelland & Stewart, 1973
 The Scorched-Wood People, McClelland & Stewart, 1977
 The Mad Trapper, McClelland & Stewart, 1980
 My Lovely Enemy, McClelland & Stewart, 1983
 A Discovery of Strangers, A.A. Knopf Canada, 1994
 Stolen Life: The Journey of a Cree Woman (with Yvonne Johnson), Alfred A. Knopf Canada, 1999
 Sweeter Than All the World, Vintage Canada, 2002
 Come Back, Penguin Random House, 2015

Short Stories
 Where is the Voice Coming from?, McClelland & Stewart, 1974
 Alberta, a Celebration (with Harry Savage and Tom Radford), Hurtig Publishers, 1979
 The Angel of the Tar Sands and Other Stories, McClelland & Stewart, 1982
 River of Stone: Fictions and Memories, Vintage Books, 1995
 Another Place, Not Here, Knopf Canada, 1996
 Collected Stories, 1955–2010, University of Alberta Press, 2010

Nonfiction
 War in the West: Voices of the North-West Rebellion (with Bob Beal), McClelland & Stewart, 1985
 Playing Dead: A Contemplation Concerning the Arctic, NeWest, 1989
 Of This Earth: A Mennonite Boyhood in the Boreal Forest, Vintage Canada, 2007
 Extraordinary Canadians: Big Bear. Toronto: Penguin Group Canada, 2008

Plays
Far as the Eye can See: A Play,  NeWest, 1977

Children's literature
Chinook Christmas, Red Deer Press, 1993
Hidden Buffalo,  Red Deer Press, 2003

References

1934 births
Canadian male novelists
Canadian memoirists
Officers of the Order of Canada
Canadian Mennonites
Academic staff of the University of Alberta
Mennonite writers
Writers from Edmonton
Writers from Saskatchewan
Writers from Winnipeg
Governor General's Award-winning fiction writers
Living people
Canadian male non-fiction writers